Colt Barrett Walker (born June 25, 2001) is an American artistic gymnast.  He is a member of the United States national gymnastics team and is currently competing in collegiate gymnastics for Stanford.  He was a member of the gold medal winning team at the 2022 Pan American Championships. He is the 2019 junior Winter Cup and National Champion.

Personal life 
Walker was born in Austin, Texas to Pam and Keith Walker.  He has one sibling.  He attended Chaparral Star Academy, graduating in 2020.

Gymnastics career

2017–18 
Walker competed at the RD761 International Junior Team Cup where he finished fourth on vault and contributed to the USA's third place finish.  He competed at the 2017 National Championships in the 15-16 age division; he placed fifth in the all-around and fourth on floor exercise.

In August of 2018, Walker competed at the U.S. National Championships in the junior 15-16 division.  He placed ninth in the all-around and won silver on floor exercise and vault and bronze on rings.

2019 
Walker competed at the RD761 International Junior Team Cup where he helped the USA win silver.  Individually he won silver in the all-around behind Takeru Kitazono and won medals on five of the six apparatuses.  Walker next competed at the 2019 Winter Cup where he placed first in the all-around and on vault and third on floor exercise and rings.  

In August, Walker competed at the U.S. National Championships in the 17-18 age division.  He finished first in the all-around, on vault, and on parallel bars and second on rings and horizontal bar.

2020–21 
Walker became age-eligible for senior level competition and competed at the 2020 Winter Cup.  He finished 19th in the all-around.  Walker did not compete for the rest of the year due to the global COVID-19 pandemic.

Walker began competing for the Stanford Cardinal men's gymnastics team during the 2020–21 season.  He competed at the 2021 NCAA Championships where he helped Stanford defend their team title.  At the 2021 U.S. National Championships Walker placed 12th in the all-around but won bronze on the parallel bars behind Yul Moldauer and Shane Wiskus.

2022 
Walker placed fifth in the all-around and third on vault at the 2022 Winter Cup.  He was selected to compete at the DTB Pokal Mixed Cup in Stuttgart  where he competed on floor exercise and vault during the preliminary round, helping the USA qualify into the championship round. The USA clinched first place in this round with his contribution on the parallel bars.  At the NCAA Championship Walker helped Stanford defend their national title.  Additionally he placed second on parallel bars behind teammate Curran Phillips.

In June Walker was selected to represent the United States at the Pan American Championships alongside Riley Loos, Brody Malone, Yul Moldauer, and Shane Wiskus.  On the first day of competition Walker competed on floor exercise, pommel horse, vault, and parallel bars to help qualify the United States in first place to the team final.  Individually he won silver on parallel bars behind Moldauer and recorded the fourth highest floor exercise score and fifth highest pommel horse score.  During the team final Walker competed on floor exercise, vault, and parallel bars to help the USA win gold ahead of the reigning team champion Brazil.

In late July Walker competed at the U.S. Classic where he placed second in the all-around behind Stanford teammate Malone with a score of 85.264 (83.750 without bonus).  Additionally he recorded the highest parallel bars score and second highest vault score.  In August Walker competed at the U.S. National Championships where he finished sixth in all-around but recorded the second highest score when removing domestic bonuses.  Additionally he finished second on parallel bars and third on vault.

In October Walker was named to the team to compete at the 2022 World Championships alongside Asher Hong, Brody Malone, Stephen Nedoroscik, and Donnell Whittenburg.  During qualifications Walker finished fourteenth on parallel bars but did not qualify for the event final.  During the team final Walker contributed scores on vault, parallel bars, and horizontal bar towards the USA's fifth place finish.

Competitive history

References

External links
 
 

2001 births
Living people
Sportspeople from Austin, Texas
American male artistic gymnasts
Stanford Cardinal men's gymnasts